is a Japanese term referring to industrial and financial vertically integrated business conglomerates in the Empire of Japan, whose influence and size allowed control over significant parts of the Japanese economy from the Meiji period until the end of World War II. A zaibatsu general structure included a family-owned holding company on top, and a bank which financed the other, mostly industrial subsidiaries within them. Although the zaibatsu played an important role in the Japanese economy from the 1860s to 1945, they increased in number and importance following the Russo-Japanese War of 1904–1905, World War I and Japan's subsequent attempt to conquer East Asia during the inter-war period and World War II. After World War II they were dissolved by the Allied occupation forces and succeeded by the keiretsu (groups of banks, manufacturers, suppliers, and distributors). Equivalents to the zaibatsu can still be found in other countries, such as the chaebol conglomerates of South Korea.

Terminology
Although zaibatsu themselves existed from the 19th century, the term was not in common use until after World War I. By definition, the zaibatsu were large family-controlled vertical monopolies consisting of a holding company on top, with a wholly-owned banking subsidiary providing finance, and several industrial subsidiaries dominating specific sectors of a market, either solely, or through a number of subsidiary companies.

Significance
The zaibatsu were the heart of economic and industrial activity within the Empire of Japan, and held great influence over Japanese national and foreign policies. The Rikken Seiyūkai political party was regarded as an extension of the Mitsui group, which also had very strong connections with the Imperial Japanese Army. Likewise, the Rikken Minseitō was connected to the Mitsubishi group, as was the Imperial Japanese Navy.

The zaibatsu were viewed with suspicion by both the right and left of the political spectrum in the 1920s and 1930s. Although the world was in the throes of a worldwide economic depression, the zaibatsu were prospering through currency speculation, maintenance of low labour costs and military procurement. Matters came to a head in the League of Blood Incident of March 1932, with the assassination of the managing director of Mitsui, after which the zaibatsu attempted to improve their public image through increased charity work.

History and development

The zaibatsu were at the heart of economic and industrial activity within the Empire of Japan since Japanese industrialization accelerated during the Meiji era. They held great influence over Japanese national and foreign policies which only increased following the Japanese victory over Russia in the Russo-Japanese War of 1904–1905 and Japan's victories over Germany during World War I. During the inter-war period the zaibatsu aided Japanese militarism and benefited from the conquest of East Asia by receiving lucrative contracts.

When Japan emerged from the self-imposed, pre-Meiji era sakoku in 1867, Western countries already had very dominant and internationally significant companies. Standard Oil, Carnegie Steel Company, AT&T, General Electric, Western Union, Friedrich Krupp AG, Thyssen AG, Robert Bosch GmbH, Lloyd's of London, Reckitt and Sons, East India Company, and British Petroleum were very dominant and were the major players in international trade. The British Empire, under the leadership of the Baring family, the Rothschild family and the Guinness family, as well as Imperial Germany and other European countries were colonizing much of the undeveloped world, and Japanese companies realized that in order to remain sovereign, they needed to develop the same methodology and mindset of North American and European companies, and the zaibatsu emerged.

Big four
The  of, in chronological order of founding, Sumitomo, Mitsui, Mitsubishi, and Yasuda were the most significant zaibatsu groups. Two of them, Sumitomo and Mitsui, had roots in the Edo period while Mitsubishi and Yasuda traced their origins to the Meiji Restoration. Throughout Meiji to Shōwa, the government employed their financial powers and expertise for various endeavors, including tax collection, military procurement and foreign trade.

New zaibatsu 
Beyond the big four, consensus is lacking as to which companies can be called zaibatsu, and which cannot. After the Russo-Japanese War, a number of so-called "second-tier" zaibatsu also emerged, mostly as the result of business conglomerations and the awarding of lucrative military contracts. Some more famous second-tier zaibatsu include the Ōkura, Furukawa, and Nakajima groups.

The early zaibatsu permitted some public shareholding of some subsidiary companies, but never of the top holding company or key subsidiaries.

The monopolistic business practices by the zaibatsu resulted in a closed circle of companies until Japanese industrial expansion on the Asian mainland (Manchukuo) began in the 1930s, which allowed for the rise of a number of new groups (shinko zaibatsu), including Nissan. These new zaibatsu differed from the traditional zaibatsu only in that they were not controlled by specific families, and not in terms of business practices.

Postwar dissolution

The zaibatsu had been viewed with some ambivalence by the Japanese military, which nationalized a significant portion of their production capability during World War II. Remaining assets were also highly damaged by destruction during the war.

Under the Allied occupation after the surrender of Japan, a partially successful attempt was made to dissolve the zaibatsu. Many of the economic advisors accompanying the SCAP administration had experience with the New Deal and were highly suspicious of monopolies and restrictive business practices, which they felt to be both inefficient, and to be a form of corporatocracy (and thus inherently anti-democratic).

During the occupation of Japan, sixteen zaibatsu were targeted for complete dissolution, and twenty-six more for reorganization after dissolution. Among the zaibatsu that were targeted for dissolution in 1947 were Asano, Furukawa, Nakajima, Nissan, Nomura, and Okura. In addition, Yasuda dissolved itself in 1946. The controlling families' assets were seized, holding companies eliminated, and interlocking directorships, essential to the old system of inter-company coordination, were outlawed. The Matsushita Electric Industrial Company (which later took the name Panasonic), while not a zaibatsu, was originally also targeted for breakup, but was saved by a petition signed by 15,000 of its union workers and their families.

However, complete dissolution of the zaibatsu was never achieved, mostly because the U.S. government rescinded the orders in an effort to reindustrialize Japan as a bulwark against communism in Asia. Zaibatsu as a whole were widely considered to be beneficial to the Japanese economy and government, and the opinions of the Japanese public, of the zaibatsu workers and management, and of the entrenched bureaucracy regarding plans for zaibatsu dissolution ranged from unenthusiastic to disapproving. Additionally, the changing politics of the occupation during the reverse course served as a crippling, if not terminal, roadblock to zaibatsu elimination.

Modern-day influence
Today, the influence of the zaibatsu can still be seen in the form of financial groups, institutions, and larger companies whose origins reach back to the original zaibatsu, often sharing the same original family names (for example, Sumitomo Mitsui Banking Corporation). However, some argue that the "old mechanisms of financial and administrative control" that zaibatsu once enjoyed have been destroyed. Keiretsu, meaning "series" or "subsidiary", could be interpreted as being suggestive of this difference.

List of zaibatsu

The "big four"
 Mitsubishi (三菱財閥)
 Mitsui (三井財閥)
 Sumitomo (住友財閥)
 Yasuda (安田財閥)

Second-tier zaibatsu
 Asano (浅野財閥)
 Fujita (藤田財閥)
 Furukawa (古河財閥)
 Mori (森コンツェルン)
 Kawasaki (川崎財閥)
 Nakajima (中島飛行機)
 Nichitsu (日窒コンツェルン)
 Nissan (日産コンツェルン)
 Nisso (日曹コンツェルン)
 Nomura (野村財閥)
 Okura (大倉財閥)
 Riken (理研コンツェルン)
 Shibusawa (渋沢財閥)

Bankrupt zaibatsu
 Suzuki shoten (鈴木商店)

Popular culture 

The term zaibatsu has been used often in books, comics, games, and films, referring to large and usually sinister Japanese corporations, who are often involved in shady dealings or have connections to the yakuza. Examples include the Mishima Zaibatsu, which is prominently featured in the Tekken series, the Zaibatsu criminal group in Grand Theft Auto 2, and various writings of pioneer cyberpunk author William Gibson. In other cases zaibatsu are used simply to provide the background for a character from an influential family, such as in the case of the F4 in Boys Before Flowers who are the sons and heirs of the four biggest corporations in Japan.

 In the Tom Clancy book Debt of Honor, a group of zaibatsu seize control of Japan and invade the US-held Mariana Islands.
 The video game Grand Theft Auto 2 features a gang called the Zaibatsu that the player can take jobs from. It is the largest gang in the game, and the eventual final enemy.
 The video game Hearts of Iron IV features the Zaibatsus as a modifier for the nation of Japan. This modifier is present at the start of the game in 1936 which causes a small percentage of increase in faster civilian, military, and naval factory construction with the trade-off of gaining less political power, increasing political power cost of trade laws, and higher economy costs. 
 Karin Kanzuki, a character from the Street Fighter series, is the heiress to the Kanzuki zaibatsu.
 The Itoshiki family from Sayonara Zetsubō Sensei owns a zaibatsu to accentuate their heavy economic and political background.
 In the Tekken series, the Mishima Zaibatsu is the major organization behind the tournaments.
 In the manga Tokyo Ghoul, Shuu Tsukiyama is the heir to the Tsukiyama Group, a powerful international business conglomerate that originated as a zaibatsu.
 In the tabletop role-playing game Shadowrun, several of the Big Ten mega-corporations are formed from the old zaibatsu and still carry on their managerial styles in the Japanese Imperial State in the sixth world, prominent examples being Renraku and Mitsuhama Computer Technologies.
 In the board game Nippon, players control zaibatsu and try to grow their influence and power as they oversee the era of rapid industrialization of Japan.
 In the manga and anime Urusei Yatsura, the character Shutaro Mendou is the heir to the Mendou zaibatsu, the wealthiest and most powerful zaibatsu with its own private army and even private air force. His rival Tobimaro Mizunokoji is the heir to the Mizunokoji zaibatsu, the second wealthiest and second most powerful zaibatsu which also has its own private military. Their sisters Ryoko Mendou and Asuka Mizunokoji are also important characters, with Ryoko Mendou commanding large numbers of kuroko and setting up elaborate, very expensive and destructive schemes, and Asuka Mizunokoji being terrified of all men except for her brother and also having such extreme superhuman strength due to an entire lifetime of military training that it makes the superhuman strength of Shinobu Miyake seem normal by comparison.
 In the manga and anime Killing Bites, the plot revolves around four zaibatsu and the bloody to-the-death tournaments members of them participate in against other zaibatsu teams. Recently, through gene splicing or similar technology, all of the fighters have been turned into creatures called Therianthropes – people with abilities to make partial, and in some cases complete, transformations into animals, and take on many characteristics of these animals.
In the manga and anime Kaguya-sama: Love Is War, the female protagonist Kaguya Shinomiya is the daughter of the leader of the fictitious Shinomiya group, one of the big four zaibatsu of an alternate history.

See also

 Big business
 Chaebol
 Concern
 Conglomerate (company)
 Four big families of Hong Kong
 Four big families of the Republic of China
 Konzern
 The Hongs
 Japanese post-war economic miracle
 Thirteen Factories

References

Notes

Bibliography
 Alletzhauser, Albert J. The House of Nomura. New York: Harper Perennial, 1991. .
 Allinson, Gary D. Japan's Postwar History. Ithaca, New York: Cornell University Press, 1997. .
 Aoki, Masahiko & Hyung-Ki Kim. Corporate Governance in Transitional Economies: Insider Control and the Role of Banks. Retrieved online 28 June 2004. Print edition: Washington, D.C.: World Bank Office of the Publisher, 1995. .
 
 Schenkein, Joshua (2014). Japan, the Great Power: Industrialization Through the Lens of Zaibatsu. .

External links
 The Zaibatsu of Japan
 Zaibatsu Dissolution, Reparations and Administrative Guidance.

 

Business families
Economic history of Japan
Empire of Japan
Japanese business terms
Strategic management